Redfield is a hamlet in Rural Municipality of Round Hill No. 467, Saskatchewan, Canada.

See also
 List of communities in Saskatchewan

References

Round Hill No. 467, Saskatchewan
Unincorporated communities in Saskatchewan
Division No. 16, Saskatchewan